The 1919–20 WPI Engineers men's basketball team represented Worcester Polytechnic Institute during the 1919–20 NCAA men's basketball season. They were coached by Henry C.  Swasey. The Engineers played their home games at Alumni Gym in Worcester, Massachusetts. The team won its first ever championship and finished the season with 14 wins and 2 losses.

Schedule

|-
!colspan=9 style="background:#AC2B37; color:#FFFFFF;"| Regular season

Source:

References

WPI Engineers men's basketball seasons